The Field Elm cultivar Ulmus minor 'Cucullata Variegata', a variegated form of U. minor 'Cucullata', was listed by C. de Vos, in 1867, as U. americana cucullata folia variegata and by Schelle in Beissner Handbuch der Laubholz-Benennung, 82 (1903)  as U. campestris concavifolia cucullata variegata Hort, without description.

Description
None available. The leaves of a variegated branchlet on a non-variegated 'Cucullata' in Edinburgh (2016) are flecked and marbled with cream and pale green. The variegated cultivar may be similar.

Pests and diseases
The cultivar is susceptible to Dutch elm disease.

References

Field elm cultivar
Ulmus